KAJZ (106.5 MHz) is a commercial FM radio station licensed to Granite Shoals, Texas, United States. The station is owned by Bryan King   KAJZ airs a smooth jazz radio format.  The station is largely automated, mixing instrumental contemporary jazz songs along with some jazz, pop and R&B vocals.

History
The station first signed on as KBAE on September 29, 2000.  It originally broadcast at 96.5 MHz, with 2,900 watts of power.

On August 2, 2004, the station changed its call sign to KQBT, trying a rhythmic contemporary format known as "The Beat."  On October 19, 2005, it switched to smooth jazz and its current call letters KAJZ.

References

External links

AJZ
Smooth jazz radio stations in the United States